The Telford campus of the Southern Institute of Technology is a public Tertiary Education Institution.  Its campus is in Otanomomo, just south of Balclutha, South Otago in the South Island of New Zealand. In 2019 Telford became a faculty of the Southern Institute of Technology.

Telford delivers NZQA accredited sub-degree programmes with a rural focus, including general agriculture, dairy, vet technician and equine programmes.

As part of New Zealands recovery, Telford is hosting Agricultural Contractor Training to retrain individuals affected by the SARS-CoV-19 pandemic. This will ensure sufficient contractors are available for the 2020/21 season, which has previously relied on overseas contractors from countries such as England and Ireland.

References

External links 
 

 

Vocational education in New Zealand
Education in Otago
The Catlins
Balclutha, New Zealand
Clutha District